The closing ceremony of the 1998 Winter Olympics took place at Nagano Olympic Stadium, Nagano, Japan, on 22 February 1998. It began at 18:00 JST and finished at approximately 19:41 JST. As mandated by the Olympic Charter, the proceedings combines the formal and ceremonial closing of this international sporting event, including farewell  speeches and closing of the Games by IOC President Juan Antonio Samaranch. The Olympic flame has been extinguished.

Ceremony

Opening

Parade of Nations

Handover of the Olympic flag
First, the Greek flag was raised while its playing the national anthem. Second, the Japanese flag was raised while its playing the national anthem. Third, the Flag of the United States raised while its playing the national anthem. The Olympic flag was passed by the Mayor of Nagano City, Tasuku Tsukada, to IOC President Juan Antonio Samaranch, who then handed it over to the Mayor of Salt Lake City, Deedee Corradini. The flag will be raised again in Sydney, Australia for the 2000 Summer Olympics on 15 September 2000 for the opening ceremony.

Salt Lake 2002 presentation
Salt Lake City, the host city of the 2002 Winter Olympic Games, presented a special performance See You in 2002.

Official speeches and the Games declare closed
NAOC Vice President Goro Yoshimura delivered a farewell speech in Japanese,
thanked everyone. IOC President Juan Antonio Samaranch delivered a speech in French, and English, and congratulations to the athletes, the 7 International Olympic Winter Sports Federations, under 72 National Olympic Committee that participated in this Games. And the warmest congratulations to the Nagano Committee for the Olympic Games and also a wonderful volunteers. IOC President Samaranch declares closed the XVIII Olympic Winter Games. And in accordance with their tradition, he calls upon the youth of the world, to assemble 4 years from now in Salt Lake City, United States, to celebrate with them the XIX Olympic Winter Games, the first of the new millennium. Speaking in Japanese，"ありがとう、長野。" - "Thank you, Nagano". "さようなら、日本。" - "Goodbye, Japan".

Olympic Flag and Olympic Anthem
After a fanfare, the Olympic Flag was lowered, carried away by Japan Ground Self-Defense Force from the stadium, the Olympic Hymn was sung in Japanese by the Nagano Children's Choir.

Olympic Flame has been extinguished and a song
The Olympic flame is extinguished from the cauldron. It burn throughout the 16 day competitions. And a song Furusato sung by Anri.

Dignitaries in attendance

Dignitaries from International organizations
 International Olympic Committee – 
IOC President Juan Antonio Samaranch and Maria Teresa Salisachs Rowe
Members of the International Olympic Committee

Host country dignitaries
 Japan –       
NAOC Vice President Goro Yoshimura
Emperor Akihito
Empress Michiko
Naruhito, Crown Prince of Japan
Governor of Nagano City Tasuku Tsukada

Dignitaries from abroad
 United States – 
Second Lady of the United States Tipper Gore, 
United States Ambassador to Japan Tom Foley
Mayor of Salt Lake City Deedee Corradini

Anthems
 National Anthem of Greece
 Gagaku musicians - National Anthem of Japan
 National Anthem of the United States
 Nagano City Children's Choir - Olympic Hymn

TV coverage

References

Bibliography

External links
 

Closing Ceremony
Ceremonies in Japan
Olympics closing ceremonies